Bylot Island lies off the northern end of Baffin Island in Nunavut Territory, Canada. Eclipse Sound to the southeast and Navy Board Inlet to the southwest separate it from Baffin Island. Parry Channel lies to its northwest. At  it is ranked 71st largest island in the world and Canada's 17th largest island. While there are no permanent settlements on this Canadian Arctic island, Inuit from Pond Inlet and elsewhere regularly travel to Bylot Island. An Inuit seasonal hunting camp is located southwest of Cape Graham Moore.

The island's mountains are part of the Byam Martin Mountains, which is part of the Baffin Mountains of the Arctic Cordillera. In addition to Angilaaq Mountain, Malik Mountain, Mount St. Hans, and Mount Thule are notable. Tay Bay is on the west coast. Vertical cliffs along the coastline are made up of Precambrian dolomite. There are numerous glaciers. The western shore faces Navy Board Inlet. The island's north shore, facing Lancaster Sound, is a polar bear maternity den area. Beluga, bowhead whale, harp seal, narwhal, and ringed seal frequent the area.

The island is named for the Arctic explorer Robert Bylot, who was the first European to sight it in 1616. The whaling captain William Adams was the first to prove the island's insular nature in 1872.

In the 2000s, Baffinland Iron Mines Corporation, began to develop a tote road from its Mary River Mine, and harbour infrastructure in Milne Bay—a small, shallow arm of at the confluence of Eclipse Sound and Navy Board Inlet which separates Bylot Island from Baffin Island. Milne Inlet flows in a southerly direction from Navy Board Inlet at the confluence of Eclipse Sound.

Protected areas
Almost all of the island is located within Sirmilik National Park, harbouring large populations of thick-billed murres, black-legged kittiwakes and greater snow geese. The eastern area of the island is federally designated as the Bylot Island Migratory Bird Sanctuary. Three areas are classified as Canadian Important Bird Areas: Cape Graham Moore, Cape Hay, and the Southwest Bylot plain.

Cultural references
In 2010, a painting of Bylot Island titled "Bylot Island I" by Lawren Harris, one of the Group of Seven mid-century Canadian artists, was sold at auction for $2.8 million, one of the highest prices ever paid for a work by a Canadian artist.

References

Further reading
 Audet, Benoît; Gauthier, Gilles; and Lévesque, Esther (2007); "Feeding Ecology of Greater Snow Goose Goslings in Mesic Tundra on Bylot Island, Nunavut, Canada", The Condor. 109, no. 2: 361
 Drury, W. H.; and Drury, Mary B.; The Bylot Island Expedition, [Lincoln, Mass.]: Massachusetts Audubon Society, 1955
 Falconer, G.; Glaciers of Northern Baffin and Bylot Islands, NWT, Ottawa: Geographical Branch, Dept. of Mines and Technical Surveys, 1962
 Fortier, Daniel; Allard, Michel; and Shur, Yuri (2007); "Observation of Rapid Drainage System Development by Thermal Erosion of Ice Wedges on Bylot Island, Arctic Archipelago", Permafrost and Periglacial Processes, 18, no. 3: 229
 Hofmann, H. J.; and Jackson, G. D.; Shale-Facies Microfossils from the Proterozoic Bylot Supergroup, Baffin Island, Canada. [Tulsa, OK]: Paleontological Society, 1994
 Klassen, R. A.; Quaternary Geology and Glacial History of Bylot Island, Northwest Territories, Ottawa, Canada: Geological Survey of Canada, 1993, 
Scherman, Katharine (1956); Spring on an Arctic Island. Travel literature of a research trip to Bylot Island in 1954.
Tilman, W. H. (1966); Mostly Mischief. An account of a crossing of Bylot Island in 1963.

External links 
 Bylot Island in the Atlas of Canada - Toporama; Natural Resources Canada

Islands of Baffin Bay
Uninhabited islands of Qikiqtaaluk Region
Important Bird Areas of Qikiqtaaluk Region
Important Bird Areas of Arctic islands
Seabird colonies